Emperor Xuan of Han (Liu Xun 劉詢, né Liu Bingyi 劉病已; born 91 BC – 10 January 48 BC) was the tenth emperor of the Chinese Han dynasty, reigning from 74 to 48 BC, and was one of the only four Western Han emperors to receive a temple name (along with Emperor Gaozu, Emperor Wen and Emperor Wu). During his reign, the Han dynasty prospered economically and militarily became a regional superpower, and was considered by many to be the peak period of the entire Han history. His time of rule, along with his predecessor Emperor Zhao's are known by historians as Zhaoxuan Restoration (昭宣之治). He was succeeded by his son Emperor Yuan after his death in 48 BC.

Emperor Xuan's life story was a riches-to-rags-to-riches story. He was born a prince as a great-grandson of Emperor Wu. His grandfather Liu Ju, was a son of Emperor Wu and Empress Wei and the crown prince of the Han Empire, who in 91 BC was framed for witchcraft practice against Emperor Wu and committed suicide after being forced into a failed uprising. His father Liu Jin also died in that turmoil, along with the rest of his family.  Emperor Xuan was only a months-old infant at the time and only survived due to the protection of the sympathetic prison warden Bing Ji, and lived his youth as a commoner after being released by a nationwide amnesty from Emperor Wu in 87 BC. After Liu He's short 27-day reign in 74 BC, the 17-year-old Liu Bingyi was selected by Huo Guang (the half-brother of Liu Bingyi's great-cousin Huo Qubing) for the throne, inheriting the crown that ironically would have been his anyway if his grandfather's rebellion in 91 BC hadn't happened.

Emperor Xuan has been considered a hardworking and brilliant ruler by historians.  Because he grew up among commoners, he thoroughly understood the suffering of the grassroot population, and lowered taxes, liberalized the government and employed capable ministers to the government. He was said by Liu Xiang to have been fond of reading the works of Shen Buhai, using Xing-Ming to control his subordinates and devoting much time to legal cases.  Emperor Xuan was open to suggestions, was a good judge of character, and consolidated his power by eliminating corrupt officials, including the Huo family who had exerted considerable power since the death of Emperor Wu, after Huo Guang's death. However, his execution of the entire Huo clan later drew heavy criticism from historians (e.g. Sima Guang in his Zizhi Tongjian) for being "ungrateful" to the late Huo Guang.

Family background and early life

Parentage, disaster, and a barely spared young life 
Liu Bingyi was born in 91 BC to Liu Jin, the son of then-Crown Prince Liu Ju, and his wife Consort Wang. As the grandson of the Crown Prince, Bingyi likely was born in Prince Ju's palace.

That same year, however, disaster would strike.  With conspirators accusing him of using witchcraft against his father Emperor Wu, Prince Ju was forced into a rebellion, which was defeated. Prince Ju committed suicide, and Bingyi's two uncles died with him, although it was not clear whether they also committed suicide or were killed by soldiers.  Bingyi's great-grandmother Empress Wei also committed suicide, and his grandmother (Prince Ju's concubine) Consort Shi and his parents died in the incident as well in the capital Chang'an. It is not completely clear whether they took their own lives or were executed, but the latter seems likely.

For reasons not completely clear, the baby Bingyi was spared, although he was imprisoned in a prison overseen by the Ministry of Vassal Affairs. He was put into the custody of the warden Bing Ji. Bing knew that Prince Ju was actually innocent of witchcraft and took pity on the child, and selected two kind female prisoners, Hu Zu and Guo Zhengqing to serve as his wet nurses and caretakers. Bing visited them each day to see how the child was doing.

Childhood 
Near the end of Emperor Wu's reign, there was an incident when magicians claimed that an aura of an emperor was appearing from Chang'an prisons. Emperor Wu ordered that all prisoners, regardless of whether they had been convicted or not and regardless of the severity of the charges, were to be executed. When the eunuch delivering the edict arrived at the Vassal Affairs prison that Bing oversaw, Bing refused to accept the edict, stating that no one who had not been convicted of a capital crime should be executed, and particularly not the emperor's own great-grandson. The eunuch filed charges against Bing for refusing to abide by the edict—a capital offense—but by that time Emperor Wu had realized his error and declared a general pardon. The prisoners in all other prisons were dead, but the prisoners at Bing's prison survived.

However, this incident made Bing feel that it was inappropriate for the young Bingyi to remain at the prison, and so he ordered one of his lieutenants to transfer Bingyi and Hu (Guo might have died by this point) to the city government of Chang'an. The city government refused to accept responsibility, and so Bing had to let them remain in prison. After Hu's sentence was over, Bing hired her out of his own pocket to continue to serve as a wet nurse for several months, before letting her leave. Later, the budget for taking care of Bingyi was cut off from the imperial clan affairs budget, and Bing took money out of his own salary to care for Bingyi. When he grew somewhat older, Bing heard that Consort Shi's mother Zhenjun and brother Shi Gong survived the incident, and so sought them out and had Bingyi delivered to the Shi residence. Lady Zhenjun raised him herself.

Several years later, Bingyi's granduncle Emperor Zhao found out that Bingyi was alive, and ordered that the Ministry of Imperial Clan Affairs take over the duty for caring for Bingyi. The chief eunuch at the palace Zhang He, who had previously been an advisor to Prince Ju before he was castrated by Emperor Wu in the aftermaths of Prince Ju's death, cared well for young Bingyi, and paid for his expenses and studies out of his own pocket.

Young adulthood and marriage 
Circa 76 BC, Zhang wanted to marry his granddaughter to Bingyi, but his brother Zhang Anshi, then an important official, opposed, fearing that it would bring trouble. Zhang, instead, invited one of his subordinate eunuchs (who had also been castrated by Emperor Wu), Xu Guanghan, to dinner, and persuaded him to marry his daughter Xu Pingjun to him. When Xu's wife heard this, she became extremely angry and refused, but because Zhang was Xu's superior, Xu did not dare to renege on the promise, and Bingyi and Pingjun were married, in a ceremony entirely paid by Zhang (because Bingyi could not afford it). Zhang also paid the bride price.

After marriage, Bingyi depended on his wife's family and his grandmother's family for support, and he engaged a teacher to teach him the Confucian classics. He was a diligent learner, and he also had a strong sense of social justice. As a teenager, he had many friends from all walks of life and was able to see the dark sides of society and the suffering of the people at the hands of corrupt officials. He had a strong interest in hiking. Occasionally he was summoned to see Emperor Zhao. Pingjun bore him a son, Liu Shi.

Succession to the throne 
After Emperor Zhao died in 74 BC at the age of 20, the regent Huo Guang initially offered the throne to Prince He of Changyi. However, after Prince He quickly showed his unsuitability to be an emperor, Huo removed him from the throne.  Huo, however, could not find a suitable successor among the princes. At Bing's recommendation (although the exact process behind the scenes was not completely clear), Huo, with Zhang Anshi's concurrence, decided to offer the throne to Bingyi, then 17, an offer ratified by Huo's granddaughter Empress Dowager Shangguan. To avoid having a commoner take the throne, 27 days after Prince He was removed from the throne, Empress Dowager Shangguan first created him the Marquess of Yangwu. On the same day, he was offered the imperial seal and ribbon and the throne, and he accepted.

Early reign 
When Emperor Xuan accepted the throne, his son Prince Shi was barely a few months old. Prince Shi's mother Xu Pingjun was initially created a consort.  When it came time to create an empress, the officials largely wanted Emperor Xuan to marry Huo Guang's daughter Huo Chengjun and make her empress. Emperor Xuan did not explicitly reject this proposal but issued an order to seek out the sword that he owned as a commoner. Getting the hint, the officials recommended Consort Xu as empress, and she was created as such late in 74 BC. He initially wanted to create his father-in-law Xu Guanghan a marquess, but Huo opposed, reasoning a eunuch who had suffered castration as a punishment should not be made a marquess. Instead, Xu was given the title of Lord of Changcheng.

In 73 BC, Huo offered to be relieved of his responsibilities as a regent.  Emperor Xuan declined and ordered that all important matters of the state and the army still be submitted to Huo first, and by appointing him, his affairs will be done, so Huo continued to "talking for him". He also gave high positions to Huo's son Huo Yu and grandnephews Huo Yun and Huo Shan, as well as Huo's sons-in-law Fan Mingyou and Deng Guanghan. In many ways, Emperor Xuan, although now emperor, remained intimidated by the powers of Huo and was always humble before him. In that same year, Emperor Xuan restored posthumous titles to his grandparents and parents (although, perhaps out of respect to Emperor Zhao's memory, Crown Prince Ju received the rather unflattering posthumous name "Li" (戾, unrepenting)) and reburied them with honor. In 67 BC, he also finally found his maternal grandmother and her family, and he rewarded his grandmother and uncles with riches, and his uncles were created, marquesses.

Huo Guang's wife Xian would not be denied what she wanted—having her daughter as an empress. In 71 BC, Empress Xu was pregnant when Lady Xian came up with a plot. She bribed Empress Xu's female physician Chunyu Yan, under the guise of giving Empress Xu medicine after she gave birth, to poison her. Chunyu did so, and Empress Xu died shortly after she gave birth. Her doctors were initially arrested to investigate whether they cared for the empress properly. Lady Xian, alarmed, informed Huo Guang what had happened, and Huo, not having the heart to turn in his wife, instead signed Chunyu's release.

In that same year, a major battle with Xiongnu occurred.  Xiongnu had been incessantly attacking the Xiyu (central Asia) kingdom of Wusun, whose queen was the Han princess Liu Jieyou. Emperor Xuan commissioned five generals and coordinated a plan with Wusun to attack Xiongnu at the same time. Xiongnu put the strongest defenses against the Han generals, and they largely fought inconclusively, but with the western frontiers weakened, Wusun forces won a major victory over Xiongnu, severely crippling Xiongnu's western region. For years after, without Han engaging major forces, Xiongnu was constantly under attack by Dingling from the north, Wuhuan from the east, and Wusun from the west, and became unable to harass Han borders.

In 70 BC, Emperor Xuan created Huo Chengjun empress.  Accustomed to luxury living, her palace expenditures far exceeded the late Empress Xu.

Emperor Xuan's early reign was generally known for his willingness to innovate, to commission officials who were lenient on the people, and to listen to advice. For example, in 67 BC, based on a submission from a Justice Ministry official Lu Wenshu, who was concerned about the harshness of the criminal justice system, Emperor Xuan added four appellate judges who were in charge of hearing final appeals. While this fell well short of what Lu suggested, it did help to reform the justice system somewhat.

The destruction of the Huo clan 
In 68 BC, Huo Guang died. Emperor Xuan and Grand Empress Dowager Shangguan made the nearly-unprecedented act of personally attending Huo's wake and built an impressive mausoleum for Huo. After Huo's death, Zhang Anshi and Wei Xiang became Emperor Xuan's most powerful advisors, but Emperor Xuan assumed far more personal powers than he had during Huo's lifetime. Later, Bing Ji (who had not yet revealed by this point the extent of his contribution to the emperor's survival in his young age) also became a key official. Huo's son, grandnephews, and sons-in-law remained in key posts, however.

In 67 BC, Emperor Xuan created Prince Shi—the late Empress Xu's son—crown prince and created Empress Xu's father Xu Guanghan the Marquess of Ping'en—an action that Huo Guang had opposed. Huo's wife Lady Xian was shocked and displeased because if her daughter were to have a son later, that son could only be a prince and not the future emperor. She instructed her daughter to murder the crown prince. Allegedly, Empress Huo did make multiple attempts to do so but failed each time. Around this time, the emperor also heard rumors that the Huos had murdered Empress Xu, which led him to begin stripping the Huos of actual power while giving them impressive titles.

In 66 BC, after there had been increasing public rumors that the Huos had murdered Empress Xu, Lady Xian finally revealed to her son and grandnephews that she had, indeed, murdered Empress Xu. In fear of what the emperor might do if he had actual proof, Lady Xian, her son, her grandnephews, and her sons-in-law formed a conspiracy to depose the emperor. The conspiracy was discovered, and the entire Huo clan was executed by Emperor Xuan—an act that later drew heavy criticism from historians for its ungratefulness to Huo Guang. (e.g., Sima Guang in his Zizhi Tongjian.) (For the time being, Empress Huo was deposed but not executed, but 12 years later she was exiled; in response, she committed suicide.)

Middle reign 
During the middle stage of his reign, Emperor Xuan's administration continued to be known for the promotion of honest officials who generally cared for the people. It was also marked by further fostering of relationships with Xiyu kingdoms, making them strong vassals. He was also characterized by attention to detail and willingness to have correspondences with his generals in which he kindly but firmly had concrete discussions with them on proper military strategy in dealing with minority tribes and foreign nations. An example could be seen in his correspondences with General Zhao Chongguo in 62 BC to 60 BC when Zhao was on a mission to pacify the Qiang tribes, some of which were rebelling and some of which were considering rebellion.  Zhao opposed the annihilation strategy that other generals had proposed and which Emperor Xuan had initially approved but instead advocated better treatment of the tribes and establishment of military settlements to better prepare for any future rebellions. Eventually, Emperor Xuan agreed, and the Qiang tribes were pacified without major bloodshed.  Also, after a short foray into magic in 61 BC, Emperor Xuan realized the follies of seeking immortality and abandoned the would-be costly venture (unlike, for example, his great-grandfather Emperor Wu).

In 64 BC, Emperor Xuan considered creating a new empress. At that time, his favorite consorts were Consorts Hua, Zhang, and Wei. He seriously considered creating Consort Zhang, the mother of his son Liu Qin (later the Prince of Huaiyang), empress but was still hesitant over the episode in which Empress Huo nearly succeeded in poisoning Crown Prince Shi. He then resolved to create an empress who did not have sons of her own and was kind and gentle.  He created Consort Wang, not one of his favorites, empress, and had her raise Crown Prince Shi as her own.

That same year, he also changed his name to Xun, to make it easier for the people to carry out "naming taboo" (the avoidance of using the emperor's name in speech or writing), because bing and yi were both common characters that were hard to avoid.

In 63 BC, having realized the extent of Bing's contributions to him, Emperor Xuan decided to repay him, and others who were involved in his upbringing, for their kindness. Bing and several others, in addition to Zhang He's adopted son, were created, marquesses. The prison guards who had treated him with kindness were also rewarded. His nurses Hu and Guo had already died by this point, but their descendants were tracked down and rewarded.

Late reign 
Late in his reign, Emperor Xuan began to moderately become luxurious in living but was still comparatively thrifty in his expenditures. He also began to relax from his early diligence in governing the state. He also became less diligent in realizing of false reports by officials. For example, there were large numbers of reported sightings of fenghuang (Chinese phoenixes) – mythological birds who were considered symbols of divine favor—during this period, and while in ancient China there might have been "legitimate" sightings of phoenixes (that is, rare birds that were then-considered phoenixes), a good number of these reports were later shown to be likely hoaxes, but Emperor Xuan accepted these reports without critically examining them: although in the case of reported sightings of a green rooster and golden horse in Shu (modern Sichuan), Xuan did dispatch one of his favored poets and a Shu native, Wang Bao, to investigate and to bring back the golden horse, if found (though Wang became ill and died on the way). However, in general, Emperor Xuan's reign, even in this period, was marked by his concern for the people and unwillingness to undertake military action unless necessary.  For example, in 59 BC, a major Xiongnu civil war broke out—which would leave the Xiongnu fighting each other for years. Many generals advocated using this opportunity to completely annihilate the Xiongnu.  Emperor Xuan did not want to do so but rather encouraged peace among the Xiongnu princes with hopes of having them submit to him.

His efforts paid off. By 56 BC, Xiongnu had been fractured into three separate regimes, ruled by Chanyus Runzhen, Huhanye, and Zhizhi. All three sought peace with Han, and Han was able to reduce its defense forces by one fifth, decreasing the burdens on the people correspondingly. In 54 BC, Chanyu Runzhen was defeated and killed by Chanyu Zhizhi, who further sought to try to defeat Chanyu Huhanye to reunify Xiongnu. In response, in 53 BC, at the advice of his official, Chanyu Huhanye headed south and requested to become a Han vassal to seek Han protection. In 51 BC, Chanyu Huhanye made an official visit to Chang'an as a Han vassal, and Emperor Xuan, correctly judging that he should seek to have Huhanye submit to him out of gratitude and not of fear, ordered that Huhanye not be required to bow to him and that he be treated as higher than imperial princes. Emperor Xuan also commissioned an expedition force to assist Chanyu Huhanye in defending his territory. In 49 BC, Chanyu Huhanye made a second visit. With Han assistance, his strength grew, and Chanyu Zhizhi, who had previously been stronger, was forced to move west.

In 53 BC, disappointed in Crown Prince Shi's overreliance on Confucian officials and lack of resolve, he considered creating Liu Qin, the Prince of Huaiyang, a crown prince instead, but could not bring himself to do so—remembering how Prince Shi's mother Empress Xu was his first love and had been murdered by poisoning, and also how he depended on his father-in-law in his youth.

In 51 BC, after Chanyu Huhanye's visit, Emperor Xuan, in his most shining moment, remembered key officials who had been instrumental in his success. In an unprecedented action, he had the portraits of 11 of them be painted onto the main gallery of the main imperial palace, the Weiyang Palace. The 11 were:

 Huo Guang
 Zhang Anshi
 Han Zeng
 Zhao Chongguo
 Wei Xiang
 Bing Ji
 Du Yannian
 Liu De
 Liang Qiuhe
 Xiao Wangzhi
 Su Wu

Huo was referred only by titles and not by name—which was considered an even greater honor than given to the other 10.

By this time, the Western Han Dynasty would reach its peak in terms of territorial size, even greater than during the reign of Emperor Wu.

Emperor Xuan died in 49 BC. He was succeeded by Crown Prince Shi, as Emperor Yuan. His tomb Duling is located some 15 km southeast of the city of Xi'an.

Culture
Xuan's court was somewhat of a literary center, something which extended to his royal hunts, which he turned into somewhat of a poetry competition for accompanying poets. Among the literary figures at his court were Wang Bao and Liu Xiang.

Era names
Benshi 73 BC – 70 BC
Dijie  69 BC – 66 BC
Yuankang 65 BC – 61 BC
Shenjue  61 BC – 58 BC
Wufeng 57 BC – 54 BC
Ganlu 53 BC – 50 BC
Huanglong 49 BC

Family
Consorts and Issue:
 Empress Gong'ai, of the Xu clan (89–71 BC), personal name Pingjun
 Liu Shi, Emperor Xiaoyuan (75–33 BC), first son
 Empress, of the Huo clan (87–54 BC), personal name Chengjun
 Empress Xiaoxuan, of the Wang clan (d. 16 BC)
 Jieyu, of the Zhang clan
 Liu Qin, Prince Xian of Huaiyang (d. 28 BC), second son
 Jieyu, of the Wei clan
 Liu Xiao, Prince Xiao of Chu (d. 25 BC), third son
 Jieyu, of the Gongsun clan, personal name Zhengshi
 Liu Yu, Prince Si of Dongping (d. 20 BC), fourth son
 Jieyu, of the Rong clan
 Liu Jing, Prince Ai of Zhongshan (d. 35 BC), fifth son
 Jieyu, of the Hua clan
 Princess Guantao (b. 71 BC), personal name Shi, first daughter
 Married Yu Yong, Marquis Xiping (d. 20 BC)
 Unknown
 Princess Jingwu (d. 3)
 Married Zhang Lin, Marquis Fuping (d. 33 BC) in 47 BC, and had issue (one son)
 Married Zhao Qin, Marquis Linping (d. 23 BC) in 29 BC
 Married Xue Xuan, Marquis Gaoyang

Ancestry

See also
 Family tree of the Han Dynasty

References

Sources
 Book of Han, vol. 8.
 Zizhi Tongjian, vols. 24, 25, 26, 27.
 Yap, Joseph P. (2009). Wars With The Xiongnu, A Translation from Zizhi tongjian. AuthorHouse, Bloomington, Indiana, U.S.A. . Chapters 7–11.

Western Han dynasty emperors
91 BC births
49 BC deaths
1st-century BC Chinese monarchs
People from Xi'an